France competed at the 1984 Winter Paralympics in Innsbruck, Austria. 16 competitors (14 men and 2 women) won 6 medals, including 4 gold, 2 silver and 0 bronze. France finished 8th in the medal table.

Alpine skiing 

The following athletes representing France in alpine skiing:

 Remy Arnod
 Bernard Baudean
 Jacky Flamand
 Florian Gaude
 Andre Gouin
 Josiane Guichard
 Patrick Knaff
 Virginie Lopez
 Tristan Mouric

The medalists are:

  Tristan Mouric Men's Downhill LW9
  Tristan Mouric Men's Slalom LW9
  Bernard Baudean Men's Downhill LW3
  Bernard Baudean Men's Giant Slalom LW3

Baudean also competed in the Men's Slalom LW3 event but did not finish.

Cross-country skiing 

The following athletes representing France in cross-country skiing:

 Jean-Yves Arvier
 Yves Cibert
 Paul Collet
 Pierre Delaval
 Fernand Perrissin-Faber
 Luc Sabatier
 Gerard Vandel

One athlete won two medals:

  Pierre Delaval Men's Middle Distance 10 km LW5/7
  Pierre Delaval Men's Short Distance 5 km LW5/7

Delaval also competed in the Men's 4x5 km Relay LW2-9 and finished in 7th place together with Jean-Yves Arvier, Fernand Perrissin-Faber and Gerard Vandel.

See also 

 France at the Paralympics
 France at the 1984 Winter Olympics

References 

France at the Paralympics
1984 in French sport
Nations at the 1984 Winter Paralympics